The Zuidpoldermolen is a windmill in Edam, dated between 1626-35 and was used to grind grain and drain a polder: low land that has been reclaimed from the sea and diked.

The mill is owned by the Dutch Windmill Society.

Description

The Zuidpoldermolen is a thatched octagonal internal turning polder mill in Edam. The low, octagonal design categorizes it as a smock style, and the name translates to "south polder mill." The polder in 1875 has been supplemented by a steam screw pump.

Public access
The wind-driven mechanics have been out of operation since 1949, and is closed to visitors.

References

External links

 De Eenhoorn on the website of Stichting Molens Zuid-Kennemerland (Dutch)

Windmills in North Holland
Edam-Volendam
Smock mills in the Netherlands
Windpumps in the Netherlands